"Domination" is a song by American heavy metal band Pantera. It is the sixth track on their 1990 studio album Cowboys from Hell. The song is very notable for its breakdown in the middle of the song, which is considered to be the best out of all of Pantera's breakdowns.
From 1990 to 1991, it was used as a live set opener.

For the late Dimebag Darrell's birthday in 2022, thrash metal band Anthrax played part of the song at a show.

Background and composition 
The song is composed in the key of E minor, and has a tempo of 141 beats per minute. According to vocalist Phil Anselmo in an interview with Louder Sound: "it was written in the practice studio" and he also commented: "It was the first time we were gonna actually lay it down after we'd been jamming on it. And we used the first take. It's full of energy and it's very raw."

It was one of the first songs written for the album along with "The Art of Shredding" and "Heresy".

Reception 
Loudwire ranked the song number 2 on their 10 Best Pantera Songs list. Loudwire also ranked the song number 1 on their "Five Pantera Breakdowns That Will Seriously F--K You Up" list.</ref>

The song was ranked number 12 on Revolver's 25 Greatest Pantera Songs list. They described it as "a frantic Cowboys cut that featured a gargantuan breakdown in the final minute that was clearly intended to tear down the house."

Guitar World ranked the song number 13 on their 25 Greatest Pantera Songs list, describing the song being played live: "as it was guaranteed to immediately whip a crowd into a batshit-crazy frenzy"

ManiacsOnline placed the song at number 2 on their Top 10 Pantera Songs list, describing the breakdown "The star of the show here is the monstrous breakdown at the end of the song that sees Dimebag shred up an absolute storm over a simple, crushing chug pattern."

Personnel 

 Phil Anselmo – vocals
 Diamond Darrell – guitars
 Rex Brown – bass
 Vinnie Paul – drums

References 

Pantera songs
1990 songs
Songs written by Dimebag Darrell
Songs written by Vinnie Paul
Songs written by Phil Anselmo
Songs written by Rex Brown
Song recordings produced by Terry Date